Brazilian inventions and discoveries are items, processes, techniques or discoveries which owe their existence either partially or entirely to a person born in Brazil or to a citizen of Brazil.

Physics
Pion by César Lattes, one of the discoverers

Mathematics 

 Introduction to the concept of spectrum in topology, by Elon Lages Lima in 1958
 Peixoto's Theorem, by Maurício Peixoto in 1959
 Costa's minimal surface by Celso José da Costa in 1982

Medicine

Diseases
Bradykinin by Mauricio Rocha e Silva, Wilson Teixeira Beraldo and Gastão Rosenfeld
Chagas disease, pathogen, vector, host, clinical manifestations and epidemiology discovery, by Carlos Chagas
Epidemic typhus, pathogen discovery, by Henrique da Rocha Lima
Schistosomiasis, disease cycle discovery, by Pirajá da Silva

Procedures, techniques or medicines
Chest photofluorography by Manuel Dias de Abreu
Jatene procedure by Adib Jatene
Anti-ophidic serum by Vital Brazil, he is also credited as the first to develop anti-scorpion and anti-spider serums, in 1908 and 1925, respectively

Engineering and electronics
Caller ID by Nélio José Nicolai
Airplane (first unassisted flight) by Alberto Santos-Dumont
DRE voting machine, the first Direct-Recording Electronic Voting Machine was implemented in Brazil by Judge Carlos Prudêncio in the Southern City of Brusque, back in 1989
Automatic transmission using hydraulic fluid by José Braz Araripe and Fernando Lehly Lemos.
Electric shower, by Francisco Canhos Navarro.
Orelhão by Chu Ming Silveira.
Leme panoramic camera by Sebastião Carvalho Leme

Miscellaneous
Brazilian jiu-jitsu martial art and combat sport created in the 1920s.
Vanishing spray a substance applied to an association football pitch in order to provide a temporary visual marker, was created by Brazilian inventor Heine Allemagne.

References

Inventions and discoveries
Lists of inventions or discoveries